Mehdili (also, Mekhdili and Mekhtili) is a village and municipality in the Barda Rayon of Azerbaijan.  It has a population of 1,152.

References 

Populated places in Barda District